Nash's House in Chapel Street, Stratford-upon-Avon, Warwickshire, England, is the house next door to the ruins and gardens of William Shakespeare's final residence, New Place. It is a grade I listed building and has been converted into a museum.

The house was built around 1600 and belonged to Thomas Nash. The Shakespeare Birthplace Trust acquired New Place and Nash's House in 1876. The museum traces the history of Stratford-upon-Avon from the earliest settlers in the Avon Valley to Shakespeare's time.

References

External links 

 Nash's House - Official website

Timber framed buildings in Warwickshire
Shakespeare Birthplace Trust
Grade I listed buildings in Warwickshire